Lahuradewa (Lat. 26°46'12" N; Long. 82°56'59" E) is located in Sant Kabir Nagar District, in Sarayupar (Trans-Sarayu) region of the Upper Gangetic Plain in Uttar Pradesh state of India. The Sarayupar Plain is bounded by the Sarayu river in the west and south, Nepalese Terai in the north, and the Gandak River in the east.

The site is noted to have been occupied as early as 9,000 BCE, and by 7,000 BCE it provides the oldest evidence of ceramics in South Asia.

Excavations reported earliest archaeological sites in the world for cultivation of rice, with Lahuradewa Period IA giving samples that were dated by AMS radiocarbon to the 7th millennium BCE.

See also
 Chopani Mando

References

Archaeology of India
Archaeological sites in Uttar Pradesh
Sant Kabir Nagar district